Gonyosoma margaritatum, commonly known as the rainbow tree snake and royal tree snake, is a species of snake of the family Colubridae.

Geographic range
The snake is found in Malaysia and Singapore.

References 

Reptiles described in 1871
Taxa named by Wilhelm Peters
Reptiles of Malaysia
Reptiles of Singapore
Colubrids
Reptiles of Borneo